Jacqueline Ashley (born 10 September 1954) is an English journalist and broadcaster.

Early life
Ashley was born in St Pancras, London. She is the daughter of Pauline Kay and Jack Ashley, Baron Ashley of Stoke, a Labour MP and life peer.

She was educated at Rosebery Grammar School for Girls, a grammar school in Epsom, Surrey. She went on to study Philosophy, Politics and Economics at St Anne's College, Oxford. She was a member of the Oxford University Broadcasting Society.

Career

She has been a television news reporter and newspaper journalist, writing for the New Statesman and The Guardian. She specialises in the Labour Party, the media, politics, public services, trade unions and women's issues. She was broadly a supporter of Gordon Brown's government.

Having graduated from university, she spent two years, from 1979–81, as a trainee with the BBC.  She was a producer and newsreader on Newsnight from 1981–84.  Then, from 1984–86, she was a reporter on TV-am, and a producer and reporter on Channel 4.  She moved to ITN in 1986, where she was a political correspondent.  She then moved from television to print media, and was political editor of the New Statesman from 2000 to 2002. Since 2002, she has been a columnist and political interviewer for The Guardian.

From October 2015 to October 2018, Ashley was President of Lucy Cavendish College, Cambridge. She has been a trustee of the Carers Trust since July 2019.

Personal life
Jackie Ashley married fellow journalist Andrew Marr in Surrey in August 1987; they live in Primrose Hill, North London. The couple have a son and two daughters.

References

External links
 Jackie Ashley's articles in The Guardian
 Jackie Ashley on Twitter
 

1954 births
Living people
Alumni of St Anne's College, Oxford
BBC newsreaders and journalists
Daughters of life peers
English journalists
English television presenters
People from Epsom
The Guardian journalists
Presidents of Lucy Cavendish College, Cambridge
British republicans